Jimmy Jack McBee Roberts (born May 28, 1939), known as J. J. M. Roberts, is William Henry Green Professor of Old Testament Literature (Emeritus) at Princeton Theological Seminary in Princeton, New Jersey. A member of the Churches of Christ, Roberts attended Abilene Christian University before pursuing doctoral work at Harvard University.

His teaching and research interests laid in comparative studies involving Mesopotamian and Israelite religion, Old Testament prophecy, Semitic languages, and Hebrew lexicography. Recent publications include Nahum, Habakkuk, and Zephaniah (OTL) and a forthcoming collection of essays. He served on the editorial boards of the Journal of Biblical Literature, Catholic Biblical Quarterly, the Bulletin of the American Schools of Oriental Research, and Restoration Quarterly, and was editor of the SBL OT dissertation series and a member of the New Revised Standard Version translation committee. He was the coeditor of the Princeton Classical Hebrew Lexicon Project.

Works

Books

Articles

Festschrift

References

External links
 Books by J. J. M. Roberts

Princeton Theological Seminary faculty
American members of the Churches of Christ
1939 births
Living people
Harvard Divinity School alumni